Joanna Williams is a British author and commentator. She is a senior lecturer in Higher Education at the University of Kent and is the education editor at Spiked.

Books

References

External links
 Official website

Academics of the University of Kent

Living people
Year of birth missing (living people)